Agustín Miranda (born 1930) is a Paraguayan football defender who played for Paraguay in the 1958 FIFA World Cup. He also played for Cerro Porteño.

References

External links
FIFA profile

1930 births
Paraguayan footballers
Paraguay international footballers
Association football defenders
Cerro Porteño players
1958 FIFA World Cup players
Living people